The 11th constituency of Budapest is one of the single member constituencies of the National Assembly, the national legislature of Hungary. The constituency standard abbreviation: Budapest 11. OEVK.

Since 2018, it has been represented by László Varju of the DK.

Geography
The 11th constituency is located in northern part of Pest.

List of districts
The constituency includes the following municipalities:

 District IV.: Main part of the district (except eastern part of Árpád út).
 District XIII.: Northern part of the district.

Members
The constituency was first represented by Péter Kiss of MSZP (with Unity support) until his death in 2014. Imre Horváth served one term before László Varju of the DK was elected in 2018. Varju was re-elected in 2022 (with United for Hungary support).

Notes

References

Budapest 11th